In computer networks, goodput (a portmanteau of good and throughput) is the application-level throughput of a communication; i.e. the number of useful information bits delivered by the network to a certain destination per unit of time. The amount of data considered excludes protocol overhead bits as well as retransmitted data packets. This is related to the amount of time from the first bit of the first packet sent (or delivered) until the last bit of the last packet is delivered. 

For example, if a file is transferred, the goodput that the user experiences corresponds to the file size in bits divided by the file transfer time. The goodput is always lower than the throughput (the gross bit rate that is transferred physically), which generally is lower than network access connection speed (the channel capacity or bandwidth).

Examples of factors that cause lower goodput than throughput are:
 Protocol overhead: Typically, transport layer, network layer and sometimes datalink layer protocol overhead is included in the throughput, but is excluded from the goodput.
 Transport layer flow control and congestion avoidance: For example, TCP slow start may cause a lower goodput than the maximum throughput.
 Retransmission of lost or corrupt packets due to transport layer automatic repeat request (ARQ), caused by bit errors or packet dropping in congested switches and routers, is included in the datalink layer or network layer throughput but not in the goodput.

Example
Imagine that a file is being transferred using HTTP over a switched Ethernet connection with a total channel capacity of 100 megabits per second. The file cannot be transferred over Ethernet as a single continuous stream; instead, it must be broken down into individual chunks. These chunks must be no larger than the maximum transmission unit of IP over Ethernet, which is 1500 bytes. Each packet requires 20 bytes of IPv4 header information and 20 bytes of TCP header information, so only 1460 bytes are available per packet for the file transfer data itself (Linux and macOS are further limited to 1448 bytes as they also carry a 12-byte time stamp). Furthermore, the data is transmitted over Ethernet in a frame, which imposes a 26 byte overhead per packet. Given these overheads, the maximum goodput is 1460/1526 × 100 Mbit/s which is 95.67 megabits per second or 11.959 megabytes per second.

Note that this example doesn't consider some additional Ethernet overhead, such as the interframe gap (a minimum of 96 bit times), or collisions (which have a variable impact, depending on the network load). TCP itself also adds the overhead of acknowledgements (which along with the round-trip delay time and the TCP window size in effect will rate-limit each individual TCP connection, see bandwidth-delay product). This example also does not consider the overhead of the HTTP protocol itself, which becomes relevant when transferring small files.

Data delivery time
The goodput is a ratio between delivered amount of information, and the total delivery time. This delivery time includes:
 Inter-packet time gaps caused by packet generation processing time (a source that does not use the full network capacity), or by protocol timing (for example collision avoidance)
 Data and overhead transmission delay (amount of data divided by bit rate)
 Propagation delay (distance divided by wave propagation speed)
 Packet queuing delay
 NAT translation delay
 Intermediate node store-and-forward processing delay
 Packet retransmission time (in case of deleted packets in congested routers, or detected bit errors)
 Delayed acknowledge due to flow control, congestion avoidance and processing delay

See also
 Measuring network throughput
 Link and system spectral efficiency

References

Sources
 Goodput calculation
 Energy-Efficient Power and Rate Control with QoS Constraints: A Game-Theoretic Approach
 RFC 2647 — Benchmarking Terminology for Firewall Performance

Network performance